Westville was a railroad station in Westville, New Jersey which operated from 1857–1971 on what has become the Vineland Secondary right-of-way. It is the site of new station of the proposed Glassboro–Camden Line.

History
The station stop was part of Camden and Woodbury Railroad, which began 1837–1838, but ran irregularly and was later abandoned.

The West Jersey Railroad (WJ) was granted its charter by the state of New Jersey on February 5, 1853, to build a line from Camden to Cape May. and the directors of the company met on July 15, 1853, to select the route on which they would build. The line was built in stages with the backing of the Camden and Amboy from Camden to Glassboro. The first  of the line using the right-of-way built by the Camden and Woodbury Railroad was opened on April 15, 1857.

Railroad service increased and through acquisitions the line became part of Pennsylvania-Reading Seashore Lines, which was electrified for part of its existence. (The power house on River Drive Avenue in Westville was the last remnant of the electrified railroad.) It later became diesel service.

Passenger service through Westville ended on February 5, 1971.

Future

Crown Point Road is a planned station of the proposed Glassboro–Camden Line light rail system, to be located along the Vineland Secondary right-of way. It will be located between Station Avenue and Broadway at the Westville station site just east of U.S. Route 130 (known as Crown Point Avenue). The station design includes a single platform station and park and ride.

References 

Westville, New Jersey
Former Pennsylvania-Reading Seashore Lines stations
Railway stations in Gloucester County, New Jersey
Former railway stations in New Jersey
Railway stations closed in 1971
1971 disestablishments in New Jersey
1857 establishments in New Jersey
Railway stations in the United States opened in 1857